Sidoti is a surname. Notable people with the surname include:

 Annarita Sidoti (1969–2015), Italian race walker
 Chris Sidoti, Australian human rights lawyer
 John Sidoti (born 1970), Australian politician
 Francesco Sidoti, Italian sociologist and criminologist

Italian-language surnames